The New Zealand cricket team toured the West Indies in August 2022 to play three One Day International (ODI) and three Twenty20 International (T20I) matches. The ODI series formed part of the inaugural 2020–2023 ICC Cricket World Cup Super League, with the tour took place straight after New Zealand's tour of the Netherlands.

Originally the tour was scheduled to take place in July 2020, but the COVID-19 pandemic put the tour in doubt. In April 2020, David White, Chief Executive of New Zealand Cricket, said that the tour would be "most unlikely" to happen. However, the tour was postponed after the fixtures clashed with the West Indies rescheduled tour to England. The full details of the rescheduled tour were confirmed on 1 June 2022.

Squads

On 13 August, New Zealand Cricket (NZC) announced that Matt Henry was ruled out of the tour due to rib injury, and was replaced by Ben Sears. Shimron Hetmyer, Gudakesh Motie and Keemo Paul all were ruled out of the ODI series due to different reasons, forcing Cricket West Indies (CWI) to add Jermaine Blackwood and Yannic Cariah to the West Indies' ODI squad. Odean Smith was also added to the squad as a reserve.

T20I series

1st T20I

2nd T20I

3rd T20I

ODI series

1st ODI

2nd ODI

3rd ODI

Notes

References

External links
 Series home at ESPNcricinfo

2020 in West Indian cricket
2022 in West Indian cricket
2020 in New Zealand cricket
2022 in New Zealand cricket
International cricket competitions in 2022
New Zealand cricket tours of the West Indies
Cricket events postponed due to the COVID-19 pandemic